The 1569 siege of Kakegawa was one of many battles fought by Tokugawa Ieyasu campaign at Suruga province and Tōtōmi Province against Imagawa clan during Japan's Sengoku period.

Imagawa Ujizane, the son of the late Imagawa Yoshimoto, held Kakegawa castle at the time that it was besieged by Hattori Hanzō under the command of Tokugawa Ieyasu. After a five month siege, negotiations began, and Ujizane agreed to surrender the castle in return for the support of Ieyasu in regaining his former territory in Suruga province.

References
Turnbull, Stephen (1998). 'The Samurai Sourcebook'. London: Cassell & Co.

1569 in Japan
Kakegawa 1569
Conflicts in 1569
Kakegawa 1569